Chet Baker & Crew is an album by jazz trumpeter Chet Baker which was recorded in Los Angeles in 1956 and released on the Pacific Jazz label.

Reception

An AllMusic review by Lindsay Planer states, "The numbers heard on Chet Baker & Crew were among a prolific flurry of recordings Baker was involved in during the last week of July 1956 — fresh from an extended European stay".

Track listing
 "To Mickey's Memory" (Harvey Leonard) - 5:12   
 "Slightly Above Moderate" (Bob Zieff) - 6:59   
 "Halema" (Phil Urso) - 3:51   
 "Revelation" (Gerry Mulligan) - 3:58   
 "Something For Liza" (Al Cohn) - 4:05   
 "Lucius Lu" (Urso) - 5:34   
 "Worryin' the Life Out of Me" (Miff Mole, Bob Russell, Frank Signorelli) - 2:59   
 "Medium Rock" (Zieff) - 5:30   
 "To Mickey's Memory" [Alternate Take] (Leonard) - 5:25 Bonus track on CD reissue   
 "Jumpin' Off a Clef" (Al Haig) - 4:55 Bonus track on CD reissue   
 "Chippyin'" (Leonard) - 3:20 Bonus track on CD reissue   
 "Pawnee Junction" (Bill Loughborough) - 4:01 Bonus track on CD reissue   
 "Music to Dance By" (Cohn) - 4:35 Bonus track on CD reissue   
 "Line for Lyons" (Mulligan, Loughbrough) - 2:48 Bonus track on CD reissue  
Recorded without an audience at the Forum Theatre in Los Angeles, California on July 24, 1956 (tracks 9-11), July 25, 1956 (tracks 12-14) and July 31, 1956 (tracks 1-8) - 7 more tracks including individual features can be found on the Young Chet CD or the Complete at the Forum Theatre 2-CD set

Personnel
Chet Baker - trumpet, vocal on track 14
Phil Urso - tenor saxophone 
Bobby Timmons - piano
Jimmy Bond - bass
Peter Littman - drums
Bill Loughborough - chromatic timpani (tracks 1, 9 & 12)

References 

1957 albums
Chet Baker albums
Pacific Jazz Records albums